Victoria Viktorovna Evtoushenko  (Ukrainian: Вікторія Вікторівна Євтушенко; born 23 April 1965 as Victoria Viktorovna Pron) is a Ukrainian badminton player. Evtoushenko had won seventeen times Ukrainian National Championships from 1992 to 2000. She also won five titles at the Soviet National Championships before Ukraine declare the Independence. She competed at the 1996 and 2000 Summer Olympics. Evtoushenko played in the women's and mixed doubles event at the Olympic Games, finished in 17 position in the women's doubles event in 1996 and 2000 partnered with Elena Nozdran, and in the mixed doubles event, she finished 33 in 1996 and 17 in 2000 partnered with Vladislav Druzchenko.

Achievements

IBF World Grand Prix
The World Badminton Grand Prix sanctioned by International Badminton Federation (IBF) since 1983.

Women's doubles

Mixed doubles

IBF International
Women's singles

Women's doubles

Mixed doubles

References

External links
 
 

1965 births
Living people
Sportspeople from Dnipro
Ukrainian female badminton players
Soviet female badminton players
Olympic badminton players of Ukraine
Badminton players at the 2000 Summer Olympics
Badminton players at the 1996 Summer Olympics